Deirdre "Dede" W. Alpert (born October 6, 1945) is a former state senator, assembly person and school board member in San Diego, California.

Early life and education
Alpert was born in New York City. Prior to entering politics, Alpert was a member of the Solana Beach school board from 1983 to 1990, a court-appointed special advocate for Voices for Children, and volunteered at her children's schools, with United Cerebral Palsy, and with the Girl Scouts.

Political career

She was first elected to the California State Assembly in an upset, unseating Republican Assemblywoman Joyce Mojonnier.  She served there from 1990 to 1996 and was a member for the California State Senate from 1996 to 2004, representing the 39th district in San Diego County. She retired from the Senate in 2004 due to term limits. She chaired the Senate Appropriations Committee, the Joint Committee on Public Education, and the House and Senate Education Committees. In 1995, while a House member, she was unsuccessfully targeted for recall as part of a battle over the Speakership.

Alpert was reportedly known as "a moderate who could work across party lines". Alpert has been credited with the passage of legislation requiring standardised testing in public education, as well as funding schools on the basis of standardised test results. She received the Association of California School Administrators' "Friend of Education Award" in 1998. She also passed a number of bills reforming domestic violence laws to better support victims. She was named "Senator of the Year" by the California Journal in 2004.
San Diego State University renamed their City Heights Center the "Dede Alpert Centre for Community Engagement" in the same year.

Following her retirement, she served on the board of the Sharp Healthcare Hospital System, as a Senior College Commissioner for the Western Association of Schools and Colleges, and on the board of a charter school in south-east San Diego. She has also continued to be involved in advocacy regarding education policy. She was inducted into the San Diego County Women's Hall of Fame in March 2018 for her past Senate leadership.

References

External links
Join California Dede Alpert

1945 births
Living people
Politicians from San Diego
20th-century American politicians
Women state legislators in California
Politicians from New York City
School board members in California
20th-century American women politicians
Democratic Party members of the California State Assembly
Democratic Party California state senators
21st-century American politicians
21st-century American women politicians